Marco Albarello (born 31 May 1960) is an Italian cross-country skier who competed from 1982 to 2002. He was born in Aosta. His best known victory was part of the 4 × 10 km relay team that upset Norway at the 1994 Winter Olympics in Lillehammer. He also won four other medals at the Winter Olympics with three silvers (10 km: 1992; 4 × 10 km relay: 1992, 1998) and one bronze (10 km: 1994).

Biography
Albarello also won four medals at the FIS Nordic World Ski Championships with one gold (15 km: 1987), two silvers (4 × 10 km relay: 1985, 1993), and one bronze (4 × 10 km relay: 1997).

At the Opening Ceremony for the 2006 Winter Olympics in Turin on February 10, he and his 4 × 10 km relay teammates (Maurilio De Zolt, Giorgio Vanzetta, and Silvio Fauner) who won the gold at the 1994 Winter Olympics in Lillehammer, were among the last carriers of the Olympic torch before it was lit by fellow Italian cross-country skier Stefania Belmondo. Albarello was the coach of the Italian national cross-country ski team until May 2007.
He's married with Silvana Domaine  and he has one son; Jacopo Albarello and one daughter; Giorgia Carlotta Albarello.

Cross-country skiing results
All results are sourced from the International Ski Federation (FIS).

Olympic Games
 5 medals – (1 gold, 3 silver, 1 bronze)

World Championships
 4 medals – (1 gold, 2 silver, 1 bronze)

World Cup

Season standings

Individual podiums
2 victories 
6 podiums

Team podiums
 2 victories 
 10 podiums 

Note:  Until the 1999 World Championships and the 1994 Olympics, World Championship and Olympic races were included in the World Cup scoring system.

References

External links
 
 
 

1960 births
Living people
People from Aosta
Italian male cross-country skiers
Cross-country skiers at the 1988 Winter Olympics
Cross-country skiers at the 1992 Winter Olympics
Cross-country skiers at the 1994 Winter Olympics
Cross-country skiers at the 1998 Winter Olympics
Olympic medalists in cross-country skiing
Cross-country skiers of Gruppo Sportivo Esercito
FIS Nordic World Ski Championships medalists in cross-country skiing
Medalists at the 1998 Winter Olympics
Medalists at the 1994 Winter Olympics
Medalists at the 1992 Winter Olympics
Olympic gold medalists for Italy
Olympic silver medalists for Italy
Olympic bronze medalists for Italy
Olympic cross-country skiers of Italy
Sportspeople from Aosta Valley